Blepharocerus ignitalis, the flame-bordered longhorn, is a species of snout moth in the genus Blepharocerus. It was described by George Hampson in 1906. It is found from Mexico to Bolivia, where it is known from montane woodland and cloudforest habitats.

References

Moths described in 1906
Chrysauginae